For computer science, in statistical learning theory, a representer theorem is any of several related results stating that a minimizer  of a regularized empirical risk functional defined over a reproducing kernel Hilbert space can be represented as a finite linear combination of kernel products evaluated on the input points in the training set data.

Formal statement
The following Representer Theorem and its proof are due to Schölkopf, Herbrich, and Smola: 

Theorem: Consider a positive-definite real-valued kernel  on a non-empty set  with a corresponding reproducing kernel Hilbert space .  Let there be given
 a training sample ,
 a strictly increasing real-valued function , and
 an arbitrary error function , 
which together define the following regularized empirical risk functional on :

Then, any minimizer of the empirical risk

admits a representation of the form:

where  for all .

Proof:
Define a mapping

(so that  is itself a map ).  Since  is a reproducing kernel, then

where  for all .

The above orthogonal decomposition and the reproducing property together show that applying  to any training point  produces

Therefore setting  does not affect the first term of (*), while it strictly decreases the second term.  Consequently, any minimizer  in (*) must have , i.e., it must be of the form

which is the desired result.

Generalizations
The Theorem stated above is a particular example of a family of results that are collectively referred to as "representer theorems"; here we describe several such.

The first statement of a representer theorem was due to Kimeldorf and Wahba for the special case in which

Schölkopf, Herbrich, and Smola generalized this result by relaxing the assumption of the squared-loss cost and allowing the regularizer to be any strictly monotonically increasing function  of the Hilbert space norm.

It is possible to generalize further by augmenting the regularized empirical risk functional through the addition of unpenalized offset terms.  For example, Schölkopf, Herbrich, and Smola also consider the minimization

Under the assumption that the  matrix  has rank , they show that the minimizer  in 
admits a representation of the form

The conditions under which a representer theorem exists were investigated by Argyriou, Micchelli, and Pontil, who proved the following:

Then given a training sample  and an arbitrary error function , a minimizer

of the regularized empirical risk admits a representation of the form

where  for all , if and only if there exists a nondecreasing function  for which

Effectively, this result provides a necessary and sufficient condition on a differentiable regularizer  under which the corresponding regularized empirical risk minimization  will have a representer theorem.  In particular, this shows that a broad class of regularized risk minimizations (much broader than those originally considered by Kimeldorf and Wahba) have representer theorems.

Applications
Representer theorems are useful from a practical standpoint because they dramatically simplify the regularized empirical risk minimization problem . In contrast, the representation of  afforded by a representer theorem reduces the original (infinite-dimensional) minimization problem to a search for the optimal -dimensional vector of coefficients ;  can then be obtained by applying any standard function minimization algorithm. Consequently, representer theorems provide the theoretical basis for the reduction of the general machine learning problem to algorithms that can actually be implemented on computers in practice.

The following provides an example of how to solve for the minimizer whose existence is guaranteed by the representer theorem. This method works for any positive definite kernel , and allows us to transform a complicated (possibly infinite dimensional) optimization problem into a simple linear system that can be solved numerically. 

Assume that we are using a least squares error function 

 

and a regularization function 
By the representer theorem, the minimizer

has the form

Noting that

we see that  has the form

This can be factored out and simplified to
 

Since  is positive definite, there is indeed a single global minima for this expression. Let  and note that  is convex. Then , the global minima, can be solved by setting . Recalling that all positive definite matricies are invertible, we see that

so the minimizer may be found via a linear solve.

See also
 Mercer's theorem
 Kernel methods

References

Computational learning theory
Theoretical computer science
Hilbert space